Queens Place is an urban shopping mall in Elmhurst, Queens, New York City. Just northwest of the larger Queens Center, it is located on Queens Boulevard between 55th and 56th Avenues. The building was constructed in 1965 as Macy's and was designed by Skidmore, Owings & Merrill. It was later converted to Stern's, due to Macy's of Elmhurst moving into Queens Center, as part of Macy's dissolving of Abraham & Straus, in 1994, and then, as a result of Macy's dissolving Stern's in 2001, closed by Federated Department Stores. Today its flagship stores are Best Buy, Macy's Furniture Gallery, and Target, and it contains many smaller stores such as Red Lobster, Dunkin Donuts, Macy's Backstage  and Mrs. Fields' Cookies.

History
In the 1960's, This building was formerly a Macy's Department Store. A house next to the Macy's, who belonged to Mary Sendek, refused to sell her childhood home which she lived in for her lifetime. Eventually, the house still remained until she died in 1980, when it was torn down completely, replaced by a citibank. During this time, Macy's had moved out of the property and was replaced by a Sterns. However, Macy's dissolved Sterns in 2001 and by 2002, Sterns closed and later on, a mall was built on its former space, with Macy's Furniture Gallery being a tenant at this mall and being one of the last parts of the building owned by Macy's. Surprisingly though, the developers who made this mall kept the original Macy's design. In 2013, Daffy's closed due to poor sales. In 2015, Macy's announced they would open a Macy's Backstage Store inside the former Daffy's. The store opened in 2016. On December 22, 2017, Queens Place was acquired by Madison International Realty from Forest City Realty Trust. The real estate private equity firm had previously acquired a 49% stake in the Forest City portfolio in 2011 and purchased the remaining 51% in 2017 to make Madison International Realty one of the largest retail landlords in New York. French bank Natixis refinanced the property with a $100 million loan in April 2018. At around 2018-2020 Target announced they would close their store, However after people saying it would affect the local community, Target remained and instead renovated their store. In 2022, DSW Inc. announced they would close their store permanently. The store closed a few weeks later.

On January 4, 2021, Queens Place Mall was shut down for several hours after the NYPD was investigating what appeared to be a "suspicious vehicle' in the parking lot that possibly had a bomb inside. However, it was revealed that it was a "hoax". The Mall opened several hours later on the same day.

Architecture and design

Queens Place is bounded by Queens Boulevard to the southwest, 56th Avenue to the south, 90th Street to the east, Justice Avenue to the northeast, and 55th Avenue to the north and northwest. The main entrance to the Queens Place Mall faces Queens Boulevard, while there is a parking garage entrance on 56th Avenue and 90th Street. Queens Center is one block southeast on Queens Boulevard, between 57th and 59th Avenues.

The building was originally planned to be completely round. However, Mary Sendek—the owner of the corner house at 55th Avenue and Queens Boulevard—held out and refused to sell the property, her childhood home. Subsequently, the mall was reconfigured with a small notch on one corner, around Sendek's house. Sendek continued to live in the small house until her death in 1980.

Anchor Tenants

Current
Target
Best Buy
Macy's Furniture Gallery

Former 
Macy's 
DSW
Stern's

References

External links
 Queens Place Mall (Aerial & Street View)
 forestcity.net

Shopping malls in New York City
Shopping malls established in 1965
Commercial buildings in Queens, New York
Tourist attractions in Queens, New York
Elmhurst, Queens
Macy's
Skidmore, Owings & Merrill buildings
1965 establishments in New York City